Obadiah Noel (born June 28, 1999) is an American professional basketball player for the Westchester Knicks of the NBA G League. He played college basketball for the UMass Lowell River Hawks.

Early life and high school career
Noel began his high school career at Saint John's Catholic Prep. For his senior season, Noel transferred to Tuscarora High School, playing under coach Darryl Whiten. He scored 41 points in a game during his senior season. As a senior, Noel averaged 22.4 points, 5.2 rebounds and 3.5 assists per game. He was named Frederick County Player of the Year. Noel committed to playing college basketball at UMass Lowell, the only team to offer him a scholarship.

College career
Noel averaged 6.5 points per game as a freshman off the bench. He was named to the America East All-Rookie Team. As a sophomore, Noel averaged 14.6 points, 3.5 rebounds, and 2 assists per game. Noel averaged 18.2 points, 5.2 rebounds and 2.7 assists per game as a junior, earning First Team All-America East honors. He declared for the 2020 NBA draft but ultimately withdrew and returned to UMass Lowell. On November 28, 2020, Noel scored a career-high 35 points in an 82–72 loss to Illinois State. He missed the final five games of the regular season with an undisclosed injury, but returned for the America East tournament. As a senior, Noel averaged 21.4 points, 4.8 rebounds and 3.3 assists per game. He was named to the First Team All-America East. Noel became the second River Hawk to surpass 1,500 points during the Division 1 era. Following the season, he declared for the 2021 NBA draft, forgoing the additional season of eligibility granted by the NCAA due to the COVID-19 pandemic.

Professional career
Noel attended the Tampa Bay Pro Combine in preparation for the 2021 NBA draft. He was named to the All-Combine team after averaging 14 points, 2.8 rebounds and 2.3 assists per game.

Raptors 905 (2021–2022)
In October 2021, Noel joined the Raptors 905 after a successful tryout. On January 6, 2022, he scored a career-high 28 points in a 103-94 win against the Fort Wayne Mad Ants. On December 12, 2022, Noel was waived.

Westchester Knicks (2022–present)
On December 14, 2022, Noel signed a contract to join the Westchester Knicks.

Career statistics

College

|-
| style="text-align:left;"| 2017–18
| style="text-align:left;"| UMass Lowell
| 30 || 0 || 18.4 || .400 || .375 || .681 || 2.5 || 1.1 || .6 || .4 || 6.5
|-
| style="text-align:left;"| 2018–19
| style="text-align:left;"| UMass Lowell
| 31 || 30 || 28.8 || .518 || .321 || .727 || 3.5 || 2.0 || 1.3 || .4 || 14.6
|-
| style="text-align:left;"| 2019–20
| style="text-align:left;"| UMass Lowell
| 32 || 32 || 35.1 || .486 || .400 || .674 || 5.2 || 2.7 || 1.7 || .4 || 18.2
|-
| style="text-align:left;"| 2020–21
| style="text-align:left;"| UMass Lowell
| 18 || 18 || 34.1 || .486 || .326 || .753 || 4.8 || 3.3 || 1.2 || .2 || 21.4
|- class="sortbottom"
| style="text-align:center;" colspan="2"| Career
| 111 || 80 || 28.7 || .484 || .358 || .708 || 3.9 || 2.2 || 1.2 || .3 || 14.6

References

External links
UMass Lowell River Hawks bio

1999 births
Living people
American expatriate basketball people in Canada
American men's basketball players
Basketball players from Maryland
Raptors 905 players
Shooting guards
Sportspeople from Frederick, Maryland
UMass Lowell River Hawks men's basketball players